Dacoma is a town in Woods County, Oklahoma, United States. The population was 107 at the 2010 census, down from 148 in 2000. Dacoma shares a school district with the nearby town of Carmen.

Geography
Dacoma is located at  (36.660058, -98.564051).

Demographics

As of the census of 2000, there were 148 people, 64 households, and 41 families residing in the town. There were 88 housing units at an average density of 169.2 per square mile (65.3/km2). The racial makeup of the town was 97.30% White, 1.35% Native American, and 1.35% from two or more races. Hispanic or Latino of any race were 2.70% of the population.

There were 64 households, out of which 23.4% had children under the age of 18 living with them, 57.8% were married couples living together, 3.1% had a female householder with no husband present, and 34.4% were non-families. 34.4% of all households were made up of individuals, and 20.3% had someone living alone who was 65 years of age or older. The average household size was 2.31 and the average family size was 3.00.

In the town, the population was spread out, with 20.9% under the age of 18, 8.1% from 18 to 24, 20.3% from 25 to 44, 28.4% from 45 to 64, and 22.3% who were 65 years of age or older. The median age was 45 years. For every 100 females, there were 100.0 males. For every 100 females age 18 and over, there were 91.8 males.

The median income for a household in the town was $24,375, and the median income for a family was $31,250. Males had a median income of $22,500 versus $20,625 for females. The per capita income for the town was $21,848. There were 12.5% of families and 10.3% of the population living below the poverty line, including no under eighteens and none of those over 64.

References

External links
 Encyclopedia of Oklahoma History and Culture - Dacoma
 Oklahoma Digital Maps: Digital Collections of Oklahoma and Indian Territory

Towns in Oklahoma
Towns in Woods County, Oklahoma